The Music Lesson is a 1917 oil painting by Henri Matisse. 

It is currently on display at the Barnes Foundation in Philadelphia, Pennsylvania. The painting is 96 3/8 x 79 in. (244.7 x 200.7 cm).

References

1917 paintings
Paintings by Henri Matisse
Musical instruments in art